The Riyadh TV Tower in Riyadh, Saudi Arabia is a  television tower located inside the premises of Saudi Ministry of Information. It was completed in 1978.

See also 
List of the tallest structures in Saudi Arabia

External links 
 

1978 establishments in Saudi Arabia
Towers completed in 1978
Buildings and structures in Riyadh
Communication towers in Saudi Arabia